Pascale Senellart (August 21, 1972) is a French physicist who is a senior researcher at the French National Centre for Scientific Research and professor at the École Polytechnique. She has worked on quantum light sources and semiconductor physics. She was awarded the CNRS Silver Medal in 2014, made Fellow of The Optical Society in 2018, and elected member of the French Academy of Sciences in 2022.

Early life and education 
Senellart was born in Corbeil-Essonnes. She attended the École Polytechnique as an undergraduate student. She moved to the Pierre and Marie Curie University for her graduate studies, where she studied non-linear emission from semiconductor microcavities. In 2001, Senellart joined the French National Centre for Scientific Research (CNRS).

Research and career 
Senellart has been at the French National Centre for Scientific Research since 2001. When she joined the CNRS she started working in quantum electrodynamics, with a particular focus on semiconductor quantum dots. She developed a novel methodology to control the coupling between a quantum dot and a microcavity. In 2011, she was made a senior researcher and awarded an ERC Starting Grant. Based on her microcavity designs, Senellart founded the spin-off company Quandela, which develops single photon light sources.

Awards and honours 
 2014 CNRS Silver Medal
 2014 Ordre national du Mérite
 2018 Elected Fellow of The Optical Society
2021 Recipient of the grand prix Mergier-Bourdeix of the French Académie des sciences
2022 Elected member of the French Academy of Sciences

Selected publications

Personal life 
Senellart is married with three children.

References 

French women physicists
French National Centre for Scientific Research scientists
Academic staff of École Polytechnique
Fellows of Optica (society)
1972 births
École Polytechnique alumni
Pierre and Marie Curie University alumni
European Research Council grantees
French National Centre for Scientific Research awards
Living people